Tecnológico is a Peruvian football club, playing in the city of Pucallpa, Peru.

History
In the 2009 Copa Perú, the club classified to the National Stage, but was eliminated by León de Huánuco in the finals.

In the 2010 Segunda División, the club was last place and was relegated to the Copa Perú.

In the 2011 Copa Perú, the club was eliminated by Los Tigres in the Regional Stage.

Honours

National
Copa Perú: 0
Runner-up (1): 2009

Regional
Región III: 1
Winners (1): 2009
Runner-up (1): 2008

Liga Departamental de Ucayali: 2
Winners (2): 2008, 2009

See also
List of football clubs in Peru
Peruvian football league system

References

External links
 Los 16 expedientes
 La selva si tiene estrellas

Football clubs in Peru
Association football clubs established in 2005